The Volvo 850 is a compact executive car that was produced by the Swedish manufacturer Volvo Cars from 1991 until 1996. Designed by Jan Wilsgaard, the car was introduced in a saloon body style; an estate style was introduced in 1993.

The Volvo 850 was shown for the first time in June 1991, and the car marked a departure for Volvo, featuring multiple unprecedented features for the company; these included a transverse 5-cylinder engine driving the front wheels, a Delta-link rear axle, a side impact protection system, and a self-adjusting front seat belt mechanism.

The Volvo 850 was succeeded by the Volvo S70 and Volvo V70.

Models

Development of what would become the 800 series first began in 1978. The so-called Project Galaxy ultimately resulted in the Volvo 850, the smaller 400 series, new manufacturing technologies as well as the Volvo Modular engine and M Gearbox lines. When development had finished, Volvo had spent the highest sum in the history of the country on an industrial project in Sweden.

850

The Volvo 850 was introduced in Europe in June 1991, as a 1992 model year car. It was launched with the slogan "A dynamic car with four unique innovations" which referred to the newly developed five cylinder transverse engine, the Delta-link rear axle, the Side Impact Protection System (SIPS), and the self-adjusting seatbelt reel for the front seats. Initially, only the saloon was available, badged as 850 GLT, and came with a choice of 2.5L or 2.0L 20V engines.

In 1992, the 850 was brought to the United States as a 1993 model, becoming Volvo's first front-wheel drive (FWD) car on the U.S. market. A wide variety of Volvo 850 models were sold, with the first-generation models produced between 1993 and 1994. These included a CNG-powered Bi-Fuel model and a diesel engined 850 badged as 850 TDI. The 850 was available in both saloon and estate versions, with manual 5-speed or automatic 4-speed transmissions.

For the 850, Volvo created what it called "Delta-link semi-independent rear suspension". Volvo held a U.S. patent for rear axle bushings that compress under load, giving the Volvo 850 passive rear steering. It also has a tight turning circle, and is considered very maneuverable. By comparison, later large Volvos had a  turning circle.

The estate version of the 850 went on sale in February 1993 for all markets. This space is achieved by mounting the in-line 5-cylinder engine transversely (from the left to the right of the car) under the hood. Full power equipment was standard on all 1993 850 models, with a sunroof and built-in child booster seat in the back folding arm rest.

Beginning in 1994, a facelift for all subsequent 850 models was introduced; this facelift subtly altered the visual appearance of the car, featuring new front and rear bumpers, new headlights and indicators on the outside, and a new switchgear on the inside. The same year, the 850 estate was awarded the Japanese "Good Design Grand Prize" award from the Ministry of International Trade and Industry. In August 1994, the 850 Turbo was introduced for the 1994 model year as was the new 2.5L 10V engine and the T5 making . In terms of technical features, Volvo switched from 4 bolt to 5 bolt hubs, made ABS standard on all markets and introduced a new A/C system. Other options during the model run included features such as traction control, leather interior, power glass sunroof, power seats, heated seats, remote keyless entry, automatic climate control, and automatic transmission.

Beginning with their 1995 model year, Volvo introduced the SIPS-Bag on the 850; these airbags were included as standard equipment on the 1995 Turbo models, and were optional for an additional $500 on other 850 models. This made the Volvo 850 the first mass-produced car in the world to feature the side-impact airbags. The SIPS became standard equipment for all new Volvo cars beginning with the 1996 model year. In 1995, the Volvo 850 was ranked the fourth-safest vehicle on the market by the Insurance Institute for Highway Safety.

In 1996, a "Platinum" edition of the 850 Turbo was available. The exterior paint for these models came in a metallic pearl platinum-colour and had special 16 inch alloy wheels. The interior was fitted with leather seats and burled walnut accents. Only 1,500 of these were imported for the U.S. market.

In 1997, the 850 Turbo was rebadged as the 850 "T-5."

850 T-5R

For 1995, the special limited edition 850 T-5R was offered, and was a commercial success, leading Volvo to produce a second run in 1996. Originally, it was to be called 850 Plus 5. The engine was mated to a 4-speed automatic transmission or 5-speed manual transmission, the latter of which was not available in the United States. The vehicle came standard with Pirelli P-Zero tyres, providing lateral grip of 0.88 g. The engine tuning was co-developed with Porsche, as was the transmission and other powertrain components. Porsche also aided in designing some of the interior, such as the Alcantara seat inserts. These cars came as standard with nearly every feature available, only a handful of options – such as heated rear seats – were available. On the North American market only two options could be chosen, a trunk-mounted Alpine 6-CD changer and no-cost 16" wheels for a smoother, more comfortable ride and driveability in snow when using all-season tires.

Also included in the 1995 T-5R package was a front bumper with a lip, rear spoiler, side skirts, polished aluminum door sills, special graphite leather and Alcantara seats, and a black interior with deep walnut wood grain accents. Both yellow and black versions came with the same black interior as the only choice. The T-5R has an additional badge to the left of the "850" on the trunk, referred to as "The Motorsport badge". The standard road wheel was the titanium-gray 5-spoke 17×7 "Titan". 1995 was the only year that the a model was badged as a "T-5R"; the following year, as Volvo recognized the vehicle's popularity, the model was renewed with the designation "850R".

The T-5R featured side airbags installed in the seat cushions. The side airbags were integrated into the rest of the Volvo model line the following year as an option, and became standard a year after that; other manufacturers soon followed suit. The car was also fitted with an early example of daytime running lamps. Also, just like the 940, it had three-point seatbelts at all five seating positions (previously, cars had only a lap belt for the center rear seat). The T-5R also used the OBDII diagnostics system, a year before OBDII was made an automotive standard.

6964 T-5Rs were produced worldwide, of which the largest market was Germany (1,433), Italy (914; 2.0 turbo), United States (876), Japan (749), Netherlands (489), UK (440), Sweden (321), Spain (185), and Canada (103).

The 1995 850 T-5R was limited in exterior paint color choices:
 Cream Yellow2,537 worldwide including saloon and estate. Only 346 sedans in this color were imported into the United States; wagons, only 49. Cream Yellow was marketed in the Australian market as 'Faded Yellow' to compensate for the unrelenting Australian sun. The Gothenburg engineers were aware of the 1990s paint technology, and the fact it wouldn't retain its deep luster over the course of time, and hence, the clever marketing descriptor, 'Faded Yellow' was coined.
 Stone Black2,516 worldwide including saloon and estate
 Olive Green metallic 1,911 worldwide including saloon and estate

Colour distribution was limited in some countries i.e. not all countries got all 3 colours, Norway only received yellow.

Two white, two Aubergine and three grey T-5Rs were also produced. The white and aubergine cars were preproduction cars whereas the grey ones were produced by special demand for the Arabian market.
Both aubergines, at least one grey and at least one white T-5R were still registered in Sweden as late as 2014.

850 R

In the spring of 1996, Volvo introduced a new high-performance Volvo 850 as a replacement for the hugely successful limited edition T-5R. Volvo decided there should be no direct successor to the T-5R, but due to its success, Volvo decided to develop a new high-performance model. The new car, based on the T-5R, was called the 850 R, which again came in either saloon or sport wagon editions.

The only colours available were Bright Red, Black Stone, Dark Grey Pearl, Dark Olive Pearl, Turquoise Pearl and Polar White. In the U.S. market only Bright Red, Polar White and Black Stone were available. Cream yellow was discontinued for the 850 R. The saloon featured a newly designed rear spoiler; spoiler was now standard on the estate. The interior upgrades included bucket style heavily bolstered 'sport' front seats (Alcantara centre with leather bolsters), Alcantara door cards, 2-tone leather steering wheel, stainless steel '850' kick plates and R branded over mats. A 200w amplifier was also added to the 8-speaker audio system as was the option to have an SC-805/815 in-dash CD player (some markets).

For a limited time in 1996 only, Volvo offered a new heavy duty manual transmission designed specifically for the 850 R (excluding U.S. market), called the M59, which featured a viscous coupling limited slip differential. Furthermore, the M59 equipped cars were fitted with the B5234T4 2.3-litre 5-cylinder engine featuring a larger TD04HL-16T turbo, re-designed turbo manifold & intercooler, unique ecu with Motronic 4.3, uprated fuel pressure sensor and a heavy duty clutch.

Due to encumbrances placed on engine volume by the Italian government, 850 Rs sold in Italy were based on the 2.0 litre 850 Turbo. The transmission was the standard AW/50-42 used in all U.S. 850s, the M59 being available in other countries.

850 AWD

In November 1996, Volvo launched the 850 AWD. Available as a 1997 model it came only in estate configuration, featured standard all-wheel drive and was only available in certain markets. All cars were equipped with the new 2.5L turbo engine developing . The only available transmission was a 5-speed manual. Ride height was marginally increased over FWD models, a newly developed multilink rear axle with rear self-leveling suspension was standard. Visual features included front and rear mudflaps, the exhaust exiting on the right rear with the bumper being provisioned for dual outlets and specific AWD badging.

Engines

Notes
a  B5254S: 1992–1995 have Bosch LH 3.2. In 1996, both Bosch LH 3.2 and Bosch Motronic 4.4 was fitted. As of 1997 only Bosch Motronic 4.4 was fitted. Please see Volvo Owners Manual and press release for the 1995 T-5R.
 b  Modified 2.5L VAG TDI engine.

Motorsport

Volvo joined forces with Tom Walkinshaw Racing (TWR) in 1994 to build an 850 Estate Super Touring Car to compete in the British Touring Car Championship (BTCC). Despite much criticism, the 850 Estate performed well, with a best qualifying placing of third and a best race finish of fifth. The 850 Estates were driven by Rickard Rydell and Jan Lammers and Volvo finished eighth in the Manufacturers' standings of the 1994 championship. For 1995, TWR built a Saloon version, with the switch from Estate to Saloon being made mainly due to changes in BTCC regulations regarding aerodynamic aids which effectively ended any chance of the Estate being competitive. With Rickard Rydell and Tim Harvey driving, the 850 Saloons qualified on pole position 12 times and won six races, with Volvo placing third in the Manufacturers Championship. In 1996, an improved 850 Saloon competed in the championship with Rickard Rydell and Kelvin Burt driving, achieving five race wins. Volvo again finishing third in the Manufacturers’ Championship. Volvo also competed in the Super Touring category with the 850 across Europe and in Australia in this era.

In Australia Volvo Dealer Racing entered an 850 T-5 for Peter Brock and Tony Scott in the 1994 James Hardie 12 Hour production car race at Bathurst, finishing 25th. It entered the Australian Super Touring Championship with an estate version driven by Scott in 1995 and an 850 saloon by Brock in 1996 and Jim Richards in 1997. Two cars were entered in the 1997 Bathurst 1000.

See also
 Volvo S70, succeeding saloon model, largely a facelift version
 Volvo V70, succeeding estate model, largely a facelift version
 Volvo 440/460, compact models bearing a similar design (post-facelift)

References

Works cited

External links

850
Station wagons
Sports sedans
Touring cars
Mid-size cars
Compact executive cars
Front-wheel-drive vehicles
All-wheel-drive vehicles
Cars introduced in 1991